Tim Steele (born March 1, 1968) is a retired American stock car racer. He won three ARCA Remax Series national championships and raced in NASCAR's highest three series. He was inducted in the Michigan Motor Sports Hall of Fame in 2009.

Background
Steele began racing as a 5-year-old in motorcycle ice racing. He finished second in Michigan's 125cc AMA motocross division. In 1984, the 16-year-old won the NAMRA Champ Cars division championship and was the division's Rookie of the Year; he also raced in International Jet Ski Racing events that season. He continued to move up the ladder and began racing late models at Berlin Raceway. He began racing on regional touring series, winning in the American Speed Association in 1990 and the NASCAR All-Pro Series in 1992.

ARCA career

Tim started out in the 1993 Season driving for Harold Steele’s HS Die Team. It was a very successful year. He went on to win the Championship that year and earned the Rookie of the Year award. He went on and continued to win races also winning the championship in 1996 and 1997. Steele won 12 times in 1997, the most wins in the series since 1973.

In November 1997 he was involved in a serious accident in which he suffered a brain injury. At the time he was planning on moving up to the Winston Cup Series to try and contend for rookie of the year. He was ten days away from signing up with a team to be owned by his father Harold and Green Bay Packers Quarterback Brett Favre, who were planning to purchase Bud Moore Engineering. The accident damaged his brain, doctors told him he could not handle another trauma. Much of 1998 he spent going from doctor to doctor to see if a comeback was possible. He battled a dependency on prescription drug oxycontin which he was taking for headaches. Finally in June 1998, Tim made his comeback to the ARCA series at Pocono. He won the race and went on to race in five more races that year winning three of them. In 1999, Tim only competed in one race at Talladega finishing 34th after a crash.

In 2000 Tim made a full-time comeback to the series. He won three races and accumulated 14 top ten finishes and finished third in the final points standings. In 2001, Steele won four races and finished ninth in the final points standings.

The next five years were not as successful as he only competed in 16 races and earned only 3 top 5 finishes. In 2007, after a Late model crash at Toledo Speedway, Tim decided it was time to call it quits.

Between 1993 and 2006, Steele had attempted 146 races, winning 41, which equates to victories in 28% of all the races he entered. Steele's 24 victories is ARCA's all-time Superspeedway winner, including nine at Pocono Raceway. He recorded 86 top-five finishes, 101 top-10s and led 5,423 laps. That means that Steele led laps in 64% of every race he entered. He also won 31 career pole awards. He was the first ARCA driver to make over $1,000,000 USD in his career, surpassing Bobby Bowsher's previous record of $952,535 USD in 1998.

Other series

Winston Cup
In 1994, Steele competed in five Winston Cup Series races in a car owned by Bobby Allison only managing a best finish of 33rd at Pocono. He attempted to qualify for the inaugural Brickyard 400 but failed.

Busch Grand National
In 1993, he competed in two Busch Grand National Series races at Michigan and Richmond for NASCAR driver Davey Allison's team. Both races ended with Did Not Finishes (DNFs). In 1994, Tim competed in one race at Michigan for his fathers team; it ended in another DNF. In 1997, he competed in seven races for James Finch. This time he managed to accumulate two top tens and one top five finish and an overall average finish of 19.9. This would be the last year he would compete in the series.

Craftsman Truck Series
In 1999, Steele competed in 13 Craftsman Truck Series races in a truck once again owned by his father. He accumulated 1 top ten finish and led 45 laps. He averaged a 19th-place finish and finished 25th overall in the standings.

Winston West
In 1996 and 1998, Steele competed in 2 Winston West Series races at Las Vegas Motor Speedway, scoring a top five and leading 15 laps.

Motorsports career results

NASCAR
(key) (Bold – Pole position awarded by qualifying time. Italics – Pole position earned by points standings or practice time. * – Most laps led.)

Winston Cup Series

Busch Series

Craftsman Truck Series

ARCA Re/Max Series
(key) (Bold – Pole position awarded by qualifying time. Italics – Pole position earned by points standings or practice time. * – Most laps led.)

References

External links

Living people
1968 births
People from Ottawa County, Michigan
Racing drivers from Michigan
NASCAR drivers
ARCA Menards Series drivers
American Speed Association drivers